Boley is a town in Okfuskee County, Oklahoma, United States. The population was 1,184 at the 2010 census, a gain of 5.2 percent from the figure of 1,126 recorded in 2000. Boley was incorporated in 1905 as a predominantly Black pioneer town with persons having Native American ancestry among its citizens.  Boley is currently home to barbeque equipment maker, Smokaroma, Inc, and the John Lilley Correctional Center.

The Boley Public School District closed the high school in 2007 and the elementary in 2010 due to declining enrollment.  The Boley Historic District is a National Historic Landmark.   Currently Boley hosts The Annual Boley Rodeo & Bar-B-Que Festival.

History
This area was settled by Creek Freedmen, whose ancestors had been held as slaves of the Creek at the time of Indian Removal in the 1830s.  After the American Civil War, the United States negotiated new treaties with tribes that allied with the Confederacy. It required them to emancipate their slaves and give them membership in the tribes.  Those formerly slaves were called the Creek Freedmen. At the time of allotments to individual households under the Dawes Commission, Creek Freedmen were registered as such on the Dawes Rolls (even if they were of mixed-race and also descended directly from Creek ancestors.) Creek Freedmen set up independent townships, of which Boley was one. The town was established on the land allotted to Abigail Barnett-McCormick, daughter of James Barnett, a Creek freedman.

The coming of the Fort Smith & Western Railroad allowed agricultural land to be more profitably used as a townsite.  Property owned by the Barnett family, among other Creek Freedmen, was midway between Paden and Castle, and ideal for a station stop.  With the approval of the railroad management, Boley, Creek Nation, Indian Territory was incorporated in 1905. It was named for J. B.  Boley, an official of the railroad.  There were no other Black towns nearby, it became a center of regional business. During the early part of the 20th century, Boley was one of the wealthiest Black towns in the US.  It boasted two banks, including the first nationally chartered bank owned by blacks, three cotton gins, and its own electric company. The town had over 4,000 residents by 1911, and was the home of two colleges: Creek-Seminole College, and Methodist Episcopal College. The Masonic Lodge was called "the tallest building between Okmulgee and Oklahoma City," when it was built in 1912. Booker T. Washington visited Boley in 1905, and was so impressed that he included Boley in his speeches.

Boley's development paralleled that of the railroad.  After World War I, a fall in agricultural prices and the bankruptcy of the railroad caused Boley's failure. It went bankrupt in 1939 during the Great Depression.  Before World War II, Boley's population had declined to about 700. With the Second Great Migration underway, by 1960 most of the population had left for other urban areas.  So far the New Great Migration has not benefited Boley.  However, Boley remains one of the state's few remaining historic African-American towns.

Timeline
1897, by this time Oklahoma law required black children to be educated separately from white children
 1903 Founding
 1905 Booker T. Washington tours the newly incorporated Boley.  Newspaper The Boley Progress starts publication.
1907 Oklahoma becomes a state. With statehood the legislature passed Jim Crow laws similar to those in much of the South. Oklahoma was no longer a refuge for African-Americans from Jim Crow.
 1905 August 14. Killing in line of duty Boley City Marshal W.R. Shaver
 1911 Facts about Boley, Okla. the largest and wealthiest exclusive Negro city in the world. (Boley, OK: Commercial Club, 1911
 1922 "Produced in the All-Colored City of Boley, Okla." The Crimson Skull; Baffling Western Mystery Photo-Play, starring Bill Pickett, was an example of the race movie genre.
 1925, State Training School for Incorrigible Black Boys was located in Boley; it would become the John Lilley Correctional Center.
 1926 The Boley Progress ceases publication.
 1932 Armed citizens of Boley thwart a bank robbery attempt by members of Pretty Boy Floyd's gang.
 1934 30th Anniversary Celebration
 1939 Fort Smith & Western Railroad and Boley go bankrupt.
 1959 Smokaroma founded.
 1961 First of the Annual Boley Rodeo & Bar-B-Que Festivals.
1970 Oklahoma : OSSAA Boys Basketball State Champions (Class A Boys)
1974 Oklahoma : OSSAA Boys Basketball State Champions (Class A Boys)
1975 Oklahoma : OSSAA Boys Basketball State Champions (Class B Boys)
 1975 Boley Historic District given landmark status.
1976 Oklahoma : OSSAA Boys Basketball State Champions (Class A Boys)
2007 Boley High School closes
2010 Boley Elementary closes
2016 Adopted a code of ordinances

Inscription on Oklahoma Historical Society plaque honoring Boley
Boley, Oklahoma
Est. August 1903 - Inc. May 1905
Boley, Creek Nation, I.T., Established as all black town on land of Creek Indian Freedwoman Abigail Barnett. Organized by T.M. Haynes first townsite manager.  Named for J.B. Boley, white roadmaster, who convinced Fort Smith & Western Railroad that blacks could govern themselves.  This concept soon boosted population to 4,200.  Declared National Historic Landmark District by Congress 5-15-1975. Oklahoma Historical Society

Geography
Boley is located approximately 13 miles east of Prague and 11 miles west of Okemah on US Highway 62.  Boley is located at  (35.492813, -96.481776). The cemetery is located southwest of the town.

Demographics

As of the census of 2000, there were 1,126 people, 136 households, and 79 families residing in the town. The racial makeup of the town was 35.61% White, 54.71% African American, 4.97% Native American, 0.09% Asian, 1.51% from other races, and 3.11% from two or more races. Hispanic or Latino of any race were 3.11% of the population.

There were 136 households, out of which 18.4% had children under the age of 18 living with them, 33.8% were married couples living together, 19.1% had a female householder with no husband present, and 41.9% were non-families. 36.0% of all households were made up of individuals, and 19.9% had someone living alone who was 65 years of age or older. The average household size was 2.35 and the average family size was 3.10.

In the town, the population was spread out, with 7.6% under the age of 18, 9.1% from 18 to 24, 51.0% from 25 to 44, 24.5% from 45 to 64, and 7.7% who were 65 years of age or older. The median age was 39 years. For every 100 females, there were 407.2 males. For every 100 females age 18 and over, there were 490.9 males.

The median income for a household in the town was $16,042, and the median income for a family was $27,500. Males had a median income of $21,875 versus $20,625 for females. The per capita income for the town was $9,304. About 25.0% of families and 40.2% of the population were below the poverty line, including 48.5% of those under age 18 and 20.3% of those age 65 or over.

Arts and culture

Boley Historic District

Part of Boley was declared as Boley Historic District and a National Historic Landmark in 1975. The District is roughly bounded by Seward Avenue, Walnut and Cedar Streets, and the southern city limits of Boley.

Government
In the 2016 presidential election, the city gave over 78% of the vote to the Democratic Party candidate Hillary Clinton.

Notable people
Cardell Camper, major league baseball player
Pumpsie Green - baseball player, first African American to play for the Boston Red Sox
Zenobia Powell Perry - composer
Florence Jones Kemp, who founded Florence's Restaurant in Oklahoma City

In popular culture
The Oklahoma Historical Society created the touring exhibition "Thirteen All-Black Towns of Oklahoma," highlighting Boley and 12 additional towns that have survived into the 21st century. Preview materials note: "When E. P. McCabe came to Oklahoma in the 1889 Land Run his vision was to create an All-Black state. Although that never materialized, McCabe and others succeeded in establishing All-Black towns. Nowhere else, neither in the Deep South nor the Far West, did so many African American men and women come together to create, occupy, and govern their own communities. Boley, Brooksville, Clearview, Grayson, Langston, Lima, Red Bird, Rentiesville, Taft, Tatums, Tullahassee, Summit, and Vernon are the towns highlighted in this exhibit."

In 2019, the entertainment news site deadline.com reported: "A remarkable, little known slice of Black American history is coming to light with Boley, a premium event series in development at Universal Television from writer Dianne Houston (When We Rise, Empire, Take the Lead) and producer Rudy Langlais (The Hurricane, Sugar Hill). Hailed as 'television’s first premium Black western,' Boley is inspired by the e true story of an early 20th century black utopia, Boley, Oklahoma, which was established in 1904 as one of the largest and most thriving black towns in the country." The article notes: "The rich legacy of this revolutionary all-Black town and this infamous battle as the backdrop for the limited series, which has been a passion project for Langlais and Universal TV President Pearlena Igbokwe for two decades."

Quotations about Boley from Booker T. Washington
In a 2017 interview, historian Currie Ballard told The Oklahoman: “Boley was once the crown jewel of all the black towns in Oklahoma...Booker T. Washington came to Boley … twice and deemed it the finest black town in the world — and Booker T. Washington had literally been all around the world. Boley, its significance in commerce, its significance in education, parallels no other black town in the nation.”

Quotes about Boley attributed to Washington include:

"They have recovered something of the knack for trade that their fore-parents in Africa were famous for".

"Boley, Indian Territory, is the youngest, most enterprising, and in many ways the most interesting of the Negro towns in the US."

See also
 Boley Historic District
Brooksville, Clearview, Grayson, Langston, Lima, Red Bird, Rentiesville, Summit, Taft, Tatums, Tullahassee, and Vernon, other "All-Black" settlements that were part of the Land Run of 1889.

References

Further reading
“All Men Up”: Race, Rights, and Power in the All Black Town of Boley, Oklahoma, 1903-1939" by Melissa Stuckey, diessertation, Yale University, 2008
Decatur-Thomas, C. (1989) Boley: An all black pioneer town and the education of its children. [Dissertation] The University of Akron

External links
 History of Boley on The African American Registry
 Black heritage sites, Boley Historic District, By Nancy C. Curtis
 Oklahoma Historical Society, Encyclopedia of Oklahoma History & Culture, Boley
 Boley cemetery index from rootsweb
 History of Boley published 1945 from rootsweb
 
 Encyclopedia of Oklahoma History and Culture - Boley
 Encyclopedia of Oklahoma History and Culture - All-Black Towns
Decatur-Thomas, C. (1989) Boley: An all black pioneer town and the education of its children. [Dissertation] The University of Akron

Towns in Okfuskee County, Oklahoma
Towns in Oklahoma
African-American history of Oklahoma
Pre-statehood history of Oklahoma
1903 establishments in Oklahoma Territory
Populated places in Oklahoma established by African Americans
Freedmen's towns